Serbia (Serbian: ,), officially the Republic of Serbia (Serbian: ,), is a landlocked country in Southeastern and Central Europe, situated at the crossroads of the Pannonian Basin and the Balkans. It shares land borders with Hungary to the north, Romania to the northeast, Bulgaria to the southeast, North Macedonia to the south, Croatia and Bosnia and Herzegovina to the west, and Montenegro to the southwest, and claims a border with Albania through the disputed territory of Kosovo. Serbia without Kosovo has about 6.7 million inhabitants, about 8.4 million if Kosovo is included. Its capital Belgrade is also the largest city. 

Continuously inhabited since the Paleolithic Age, the territory of modern-day Serbia faced Slavic migrations in the 6th century, establishing several regional states in the early Middle Ages at times recognised as tributaries to the Byzantine, Frankish and Hungarian kingdoms. The Serbian Kingdom obtained recognition by the Holy See and Constantinople in 1217, reaching its territorial apex in 1346 as the Serbian Empire. By the mid-16th century, the Ottomans annexed the entirety of modern-day Serbia; their rule was at times interrupted by the Habsburg Empire, which began expanding towards Central Serbia from the end of the 17th century while maintaining a foothold in Vojvodina. In the early 19th century, the Serbian Revolution established the nation-state as the region's first constitutional monarchy, which subsequently expanded its territory. Following casualties in World War I, and the subsequent unification of the former Habsburg crownland of Vojvodina with Serbia, the country co-founded Yugoslavia with other South Slavic nations, which would exist in various political formations until the Yugoslav Wars of the 1990s. During the breakup of Yugoslavia, Serbia formed a union with Montenegro, which was peacefully dissolved in 2006, restoring Serbia's independence as a sovereign state for the first time since 1918. In 2008, representatives of the Assembly of Kosovo unilaterally declared independence, with mixed responses from the international community while Serbia continues to claim it as part of its own sovereign territory.

Serbia is an upper-middle income economy, ranked "very high" in the Human Development Index domain (63rd position). It is a unitary parliamentary constitutional republic, member of the UN, CoE, OSCE, PfP, BSEC, CEFTA, and is acceding to the WTO. Since 2014, the country has been negotiating its EU accession, with the aim of joining the European Union by 2025. Serbia formally adheres to the policy of military neutrality. The country provides universal health care and free primary and secondary education to its citizens.

Etymology

The origin of the name Serbia is unclear. Historically, authors have mentioned the Serbs ( / Срби) and the Sorbs of Eastern Germany (Upper Sorbian: Serbja; Lower Sorbian: Serby) in a variety of ways: Cervetiis (Servetiis), gentis , Suurbi, Sorabi, Soraborum, Sorabos, Surpe, Sorabici, Sorabiet, Sarbin, Swrbjn, Servians, Sorbi, Sirbia, Sribia, Zirbia, Zribia, Suurbelant, Surbia, Serbulia / Sorbulia among others. These authors used these names to refer to Serbs and Sorbs in areas where their historical and current presence is not disputable (notably in the Balkans and Lusatia). However, there are also sources that mention the same or similar names in other parts of the World (most notably in the Asiatic Sarmatia in the Caucasus).

There exist two prevailing theories on the origin of the ethnonym *Sŕbъ (plur. *Sŕby), one from a Proto-Slavic language with an appellative meaning of a "family kinship" and "alliance", while another from an Iranian-Sarmatian language with various meanings. In his work, De Administrando Imperio, Constantine VII Porphyrogenitus suggests that the Serbs originated from White Serbia near Francia. According to the recorded tradition the White Serbs split in two, with the half that became known as the Serbs coming down to settle Byzantine land.

From 1815 to 1882, the official name for Serbia was the Principality of Serbia. From 1882 to 1918, it was renamed to the Kingdom of Serbia, later from 1945 to 1963, the official name for Serbia was the People's Republic of Serbia. This was again renamed the Socialist Republic of Serbia from 1963 to 1990. Since 1990, the official name of the country has been the Republic of Serbia.

History

Prehistory and antiquity

Archaeological evidence of Paleolithic settlements on the territory of present-day Serbia is scarce. A fragment of a human jaw was found in Sićevo (Mala Balanica) and is believed to be up to 525,000–397,000 years old.

Approximately around 6,500 years BC, during the Neolithic, the Starčevo and Vinča cultures existed in the region of modern-day Belgrade. They dominated much of Southeastern Europe (as well as parts of Central Europe and Asia Minor). Several important archaeological sites from this era, including Lepenski Vir and Vinča-Belo Brdo, still exist near the banks of the Danube.

During the Iron Age, local tribes of Triballi, Dardani, and Autariatae were encountered by the Ancient Greeks during their cultural and political expansion into the region, from the 5th up to the 2nd century BC. The Celtic tribe of Scordisci settled throughout the area in the 3rd century BC. It formed a tribal state, building several fortifications, including their capital at Singidunum (present-day Belgrade) and Naissos (present-day Niš).

The Romans conquered much of the territory in the 2nd century BC. In 167 BC, the Roman province of Illyricum was established; the remainder was conquered around 75 BC, forming the Roman province of Moesia Superior; the modern-day Srem region was conquered in 9 BC; and Bačka and Banat in 106 AD after the Dacian Wars. As a result of this, contemporary Serbia extends fully or partially over several former Roman provinces, including Moesia, Pannonia, Praevalitana, Dalmatia, Dacia, and Macedonia.

The chief towns of Upper Moesia (and broader) were: Singidunum (Belgrade), Viminacium (now Old Kostolac), Remesiana (now Bela Palanka), Naissos (Niš), and Sirmium (now Sremska Mitrovica), the latter of which served as a Roman capital during the Tetrarchy. Seventeen Roman Emperors were born in the area of modern-day Serbia, second only to contemporary Italy. The most famous of these was Constantine the Great, the first Christian Emperor, who issued an edict ordering religious tolerance throughout the Empire.

When the Roman Empire was divided in 395, most of Serbia remained under the Eastern Roman Empire. At the same time, its northwestern parts were included in the Western Roman Empire. By the 6th century, South Slavs migrated into the European provinces of the Byzantine Empire in large numbers. They merged with the local Romanised population that was gradually assimilated.

Middle Ages

White Serbs, an early Slavic tribe from White Serbia eventually settled in an area between the Sava river and the Dinaric Alps. By the beginning of the 9th century, Serbia achieved a level of statehood. Christianization of Serbia was a gradual process, finalized by the middle of the 9th century. In the mid-10th-century, the Serbian state stretched between the Adriatic Sea, the Neretva, the Sava, the Morava, and Skadar. During the 11th and 12th century, Serbian state frequently fought with the neighbouring Byzantine Empire. Between 1166 and 1371, Serbia was ruled by the Nemanjić dynasty (whose legacy is especially cherished), under whom the state was elevated to a kingdom in 1217, and an empire in 1346, under Stefan Dušan. Serbian Orthodox Church was organized as an autocephalous archbishopric in 1219, through the effort of Sava, the country's patron saint, and in 1346 it was raised to the Patriarchate. Monuments of the Nemanjić period survive in many monasteries (several being World Heritage sites) and fortifications.

During these centuries the Serbian state (and influence) expanded significantly. The northern part (modern Vojvodina), was ruled by the Kingdom of Hungary. The period after 1371, known as the Fall of the Serbian Empire saw the once-powerful state fragmented into several principalities, culminating in the Battle of Kosovo (1389) against the rising Ottoman Empire. The Ottomans finally conquered the Serbian Despotate in 1459. The Ottoman threat and eventual conquest saw massive migrations of Serbs to the west and north.

Ottoman and Habsburg rule

In all Serbian lands conquered by the Ottomans, the native nobility was eliminated and the peasantry was enserfed to Ottoman rulers, while much of the clergy fled or were confined to the isolated monasteries. Under the Ottoman system, Serbs, as well as Christians, were considered an inferior class of people and subjected to heavy taxes, and a portion of the Serbian population experienced Islamization. Many Serbs were recruited during the devshirme system, a form of slavery in the Ottoman Empire, in which boys from Balkan Christian families were forcibly converted to Islam and trained for infantry units of the Ottoman army known as the Janissaries. The Serbian Patriarchate of Peć was extinguished in 1463, but reestablished in 1557, providing for limited continuation of Serbian cultural traditions within the Ottoman Empire, under the Millet system.

After the loss of statehood to the Ottoman Empire, Serbian resistance continued in northern regions (modern Vojvodina), under titular despots (until 1537), and popular leaders like Jovan Nenad (1526–1527). From 1521 to 1552, Ottomans conquered Belgrade and regions of Syrmia, Bačka, and Banat. Continuing wars and various rebellions constantly challenged Ottoman rule. One of the most significant was the Banat Uprising in 1594 and 1595, which was part of the Long War (1593–1606) between the Habsburgs and the Ottomans. The area of modern Vojvodina endured a century-long Ottoman occupation before being ceded to the Habsburg Empire, partially by the Treaty of Karlovci (1699), and fully by the Treaty of Požarevac (1718).

As the Great Serb Migrations depopulated most of southern Serbia, the Serbs sought refuge across the Danube River in Vojvodina to the north and the Military Frontier in the west, where they were granted rights by the Austrian crown under measures such as the Statuta Wallachorum of 1630. Much of central Serbia switched from Ottoman rule to Habsburg control (1686–91) during the Habsburg-Ottoman war (1683–1699). Following several petitions, Emperor Leopold I formally granted Serbs who wished to settle in the northern regions the right to their autonomous crown land. The ecclesiastical centre of the Serbs also moved northwards, to the Metropolitanate of Karlovci, and the Serbian Patriarchate of Peć was once-again abolished by the Ottomans in 1766. 

In 1718–39, the Habsburg monarchy occupied much of Central Serbia and established the Kingdom of Serbia as crownland. Those gains were lost by the Treaty of Belgrade in 1739, when the Ottomans retook the region. Apart from territory of modern Vojvodina which remained under the Habsburg Empire, central regions of Serbia were occupied once again by the Habsburgs in 1788–1792.

Revolution and independence

The Serbian Revolution for independence from the Ottoman Empire lasted eleven years, from 1804 until 1815. The revolution comprised two separate uprisings which gained autonomy from the Ottoman Empire (1830) that eventually evolved towards full independence (1878). During the First Serbian Uprising (1804–1813), led by vožd Karađorđe Petrović, Serbia was independent for almost a decade before the Ottoman army was able to reoccupy the country. Shortly after this, the Second Serbian Uprising began in 1815. Led by Miloš Obrenović, it ended with a compromise between Serbian revolutionaries and Ottoman authorities. Likewise, Serbia was one of the first nations in the Balkans to abolish feudalism. The Akkerman Convention in 1826, the Treaty of Adrianople in 1829 and finally, the Hatt-i Sharif, recognised the suzerainty of Serbia. The First Serbian Constitution was adopted on 15 February 1835 (the anniversary of the outbreak of the First Serbian Uprising), making the country one of the first to adopt a democratic constitution in Europe. 15 February is now commemorated as Statehood Day, a public holiday.

Following the clashes between the Ottoman army and Serbs in Belgrade in 1862, and under pressure from the Great Powers, by 1867 the last Turkish soldiers left the Principality, making the country de facto independent. By enacting a new constitution in 1869, without consulting the Porte, Serbian diplomats confirmed the de facto independence of the country. In 1876, Serbia declared war on the Ottoman Empire, siding with the ongoing Christian uprisings in Bosnia-Herzegovina and Bulgaria.

The formal independence of the country was internationally recognised at the Congress of Berlin in 1878, which ended the Russo-Turkish War; this treaty, however, prohibited Serbia from uniting with other Serbian regions by placing Bosnia and Herzegovina under Austro-Hungarian occupation, alongside the occupation of the region of Raška. From 1815 to 1903, the Principality of Serbia was ruled by the House of Obrenović, save for the rule of Prince Aleksandar Karađorđević between 1842 and 1858. In 1882, Principality of Serbia became the Kingdom of Serbia, ruled by King Milan I. The House of Karađorđević, descendants of the revolutionary leader Karađorđe Petrović, assumed power in 1903 following the May Overthrow. 
In the north, the 1848 revolution in Austria led to the establishment of the autonomous territory of Serbian Vojvodina; by 1849, the region was transformed into the Voivodeship of Serbia and Banat of Temeschwar.

The Balkan Wars and World War I

In the course of the First Balkan War in 1912, the Balkan League defeated the Ottoman Empire and captured its European territories, which enabled territorial expansion of the Kingdom of Serbia into regions of Raška, Kosovo, Metohija, and Vardarian Macedonia. The Second Balkan War soon ensued when Bulgaria turned on its former allies, but was defeated, resulting in the Treaty of Bucharest. In two years, Serbia enlarged its territory by 80% and its population by 50%, it also suffered high casualties on the eve of World War I, with more than 36,000 dead. Austria-Hungary became wary of the rising regional power on its borders and its potential to become an anchor for unification of Serbs and other South Slavs, and the relationship between the two countries became tense.

The assassination of Archduke Franz Ferdinand of Austria on 28 June 1914 in Sarajevo by Gavrilo Princip, a member of the Young Bosnia organisation, led to Austria-Hungary declaring war on Serbia, on 28 July 1914. Local war escalated when Germany declared war on Russia and invaded France and Belgium, thus drawing Great Britain into the conflict that became the First World War. Serbia won the first major battles of World War I, including the Battle of Cer, and the Battle of Kolubara, marking the first Allied victories against the Central Powers in World War I.

Despite initial success, it was eventually overpowered by the Central Powers in 1915 and Austro-Hungarian occupation of Serbia followed. Most of its army and some people retreated through Albania to Greece and Corfu, suffering immense losses on the way. Serbia was occupied by the Central Powers. After the Central Powers military situation on other fronts worsened, the remains of the Serb army returned east and led a final breakthrough through enemy lines on 15 September 1918, liberating Serbia and defeating Bulgaria and Austria-Hungary. Serbia, with its campaign, was a major Balkan Entente Power which contributed significantly to the Allied victory in the Balkans in November 1918, especially by helping France force Bulgaria's capitulation.

Serbia's casualties accounted for 8% of the total Entente military deaths; 58% (243,600) soldiers of the Serbian army perished in the war. The total number of casualties is placed around 700,000, more than 16% of Serbia's prewar size, and a majority (57%) of its overall male population. Serbia suffered the biggest casualty rate in World War I.

Kingdom of Yugoslavia

The beginnings of the idea of the first common South Slavic state were the signing of a declaration on the island of Corfu in 1917. The Corfu Declaration was a formal agreement between the government-in-exile of the Kingdom of Serbia and the Yugoslav Committee (anti-Habsburg South Slav émigrés) that pledged to unify Kingdom of Serbia and Kingdom of Montenegro with Austria-Hungary’s South Slav autonomous crown lands: Kingdom of Croatia-Slavonia, Kingdom of Dalmatia, Slovenia, Vojvodina (then part of the Kingdom of Hungary) and Bosnia and Herzegovina in a post-war Yugoslav state. It was signed on 20 July 1917 on Corfu.

As the Austro-Hungarian Empire collapsed, the territory of Syrmia united with Serbia on 24 November 1918. Just a day later, on 25 November 1918, the Great People's Assembly of Serbs, Bunjevci and other Slavs in Banat, Bačka and Baranja declared the unification of these regions (Banat, Bačka, and Baranja) with the Kingdom of Serbia.

On 26 November 1918, the Podgorica Assembly deposed the House of Petrović-Njegoš and united Montenegro with Serbia. On 1 December 1918, in Belgrade, Serbian Prince Regent Alexander Karađorđević proclaimed the Kingdom of the Serbs, Croats, and Slovenes, under King Peter I of Serbia.

King Peter was succeeded by his son, Alexander, in August 1921. Serb centralists and Croat autonomists clashed in the parliament, and most governments were fragile and short-lived. Nikola Pašić, a conservative prime minister, headed or dominated most governments until his death. King Alexander established a dictatorship in 1929 with the aim of establishing the Yugoslav ideology and single Yugoslav nation, changed the name of the country to Yugoslavia and changed the internal divisions from the 33 oblasts to nine new banovinas. The effect of Alexander's dictatorship was to further alienate the non-Serbs living in Yugoslavia from the idea of unity.

Alexander was assassinated in Marseille, during an official visit in 1934 by Vlado Chernozemski, member of the IMRO. Alexander was succeeded by his eleven-year-old son Peter II and a regency council was headed by his cousin, Prince Paul. In August 1939 the Cvetković–Maček Agreement established an autonomous Banate of Croatia as a solution to Croatian concerns.

World War II

In 1941, in spite of Yugoslav attempts to remain neutral in the war, the Axis powers invaded Yugoslavia. The territory of modern Serbia was divided between Hungary, Bulgaria, the Independent State of Croatia, Greater Albania and Montenegro, while the remaining part of the occupied Serbia was placed under the military administration of Nazi Germany, with Serbian puppet governments led by Milan Aćimović and Milan Nedić assisted by Dimitrije Ljotić's fascist organization Yugoslav National Movement (Zbor).

The Yugoslav territory was the scene of a civil war between royalist Chetniks commanded by Draža Mihailović and communist partisans commanded by Josip Broz Tito. Axis auxiliary units of the Serbian Volunteer Corps and the Serbian State Guard fought against both of these forces. The siege of Kraljevo was a major battle of the uprising in Serbia, led by Chetnik forces against the Nazis. Several days after the battle began the German forces committed a massacre of approximately 2,000 civilians in an event known as the Kraljevo massacre, in a reprisal for the attack. 

Draginac and Loznica massacre of 2,950 villagers in Western Serbia in 1941 was the first large execution of civilians in occupied Serbia by Germans, with Kragujevac massacre and Novi Sad Raid of Jews and Serbs by Hungarian fascists being the most notorious, with over 3,000 victims in each case. After one year of occupation, around 16,000 Serbian Jews were murdered in the area, or around 90% of its pre-war Jewish population during The Holocaust in Serbia. 
Many concentration camps were established across the area. Banjica concentration camp was the largest concentration camp and jointly run by the German army and Nedić's regime, with primary victims being Serbian Jews, Roma, and Serb political prisoners.

During this period, hundreds of thousands of ethnic Serbs fled the Axis puppet state known as the Independent State of Croatia and sought refuge in German-occupied Serbia, seeking to escape the large-scale persecution and Genocide of Serbs, Jews, and Roma being committed by the Ustaše regime. The number of Serb victims was approximately 300,000 to 350,000.

According to Tito himself, Serbs made up the vast majority of Anti-fascist fighters and Yugoslav Partisans for the whole course of World War II. 
The Republic of Užice was a short-lived liberated territory established by the Partisans and the first liberated territory in World War II Europe, organised as a military mini-state that existed in the autumn of 1941 in the west of occupied Serbia. By late 1944, the Belgrade Offensive swung in favour of the partisans in the civil war; the partisans subsequently gained control of Yugoslavia. Following the Belgrade Offensive, the Syrmian Front was the last major military action of World War II in Serbia. A study by Vladimir Žerjavić estimates total war related deaths in Yugoslavia at 1,027,000, including 273,000 in Serbia.

Socialist Yugoslavia

The victory of the Communist Partisans resulted in the abolition of the monarchy and a subsequent constitutional referendum. A one-party state was soon established in Yugoslavia by the Communist Party of Yugoslavia. It is claimed between 60,000 and 70,000 people died in Serbia during the 1944–45 communist takeover and purge. All opposition was suppressed and people deemed to be promoting opposition to socialism or promoting separatism were imprisoned or executed for sedition. Serbia became a constituent republic within the Socialist Federal Republic of Yugoslavia (SFRY) known as the Socialist Republic of Serbia, and had a republic-branch of the federal communist party, the League of Communists of Serbia.

Serbia's most powerful and influential politician in Tito-era Yugoslavia was Aleksandar Ranković, one of the "big four" Yugoslav leaders, alongside Tito, Edvard Kardelj, and Milovan Đilas. Ranković was later removed from the office because of the disagreements regarding Kosovo's nomenklatura and the unity of Serbia. Ranković's dismissal was highly unpopular among Serbs. Pro-decentralisation reformers in Yugoslavia succeeded in the late 1960s in attaining substantial decentralisation of powers, creating substantial autonomy in Kosovo and Vojvodina, and recognising a distinctive "Muslim" nationality. As a result of these reforms, there was a massive overhaul of Kosovo's nomenklatura and police, that shifted from being Serb-dominated to ethnic Albanian-dominated through firing Serbs on a large scale. Further concessions were made to the ethnic Albanians of Kosovo in response to unrest, including the creation of the University of Pristina as an Albanian language institution. These changes created widespread fear among Serbs of being treated as second-class citizens.

Belgrade, the capital of SFR Yugoslavia and SR Serbia, hosted the first Non-Aligned Movement Summit in September 1961, as well as the first major gathering of the Organization for Security and Co-operation in Europe (OSCE) with the aim of implementing the Helsinki Accords from October 1977 to March 1978. The 1972 smallpox outbreak in SAP Kosovo and other parts of SR Serbia was the last major outbreak of smallpox in Europe since World War II.

Breakup of Yugoslavia and political transition

In 1989, Slobodan Milošević rose to power in Serbia. Milošević promised a reduction of powers for the autonomous provinces of Kosovo and Vojvodina, where his allies subsequently took over power, during the Anti-bureaucratic revolution. This ignited tensions between the communist leadership of the other republics of Yugoslavia and awoke ethnic nationalism across Yugoslavia that eventually resulted in its breakup, with Slovenia, Croatia, Bosnia and Herzegovina, and Macedonia declaring independence during 1991 and 1992. Serbia and Montenegro remained together as the Federal Republic of Yugoslavia (FRY). However, according to the Badinter Commission, the country was not legally considered a continuation of the former SFRY, but a new state.

Fueled by ethnic tensions, the Yugoslav Wars (1991–2001) erupted, with the most severe conflicts taking place in Croatia and Bosnia, where the large ethnic Serb communities opposed independence from Yugoslavia. The FRY remained outside the conflicts, but provided logistic, military and financial support to Serb forces in the wars. In response, the UN imposed sanctions against Yugoslavia which led to political isolation and the collapse of the economy (GDP decreased from $24 billion in 1990 to under $10 billion in 1993). Serbia was in the 2000s sued on the charges of alleged genocide by neighbouring Bosnia and Herzegovina and Croatia but in both cases the main charges against Serbia were dismissed. 

Multi-party democracy was introduced in Serbia in 1990, officially dismantling the one-party system. Critics of Milošević stated that the government continued to be authoritarian despite constitutional changes, as Milošević maintained strong political influence over the state media and security apparatus. When the ruling Socialist Party of Serbia refused to accept its defeat in municipal elections in 1996, Serbians engaged in large protests against the government. 

In 1998, continued clashes between the Albanian guerilla Kosovo Liberation Army and Yugoslav security forces led to the short Kosovo War (1998–99), in which NATO intervened, leading to the withdrawal of Serbian forces and the establishment of UN administration in the province. After the Yugoslav Wars, Serbia became home to highest number of refugees and internally displaced persons in Europe.

After presidential elections in September 2000, opposition parties accused Milošević of electoral fraud. A campaign of civil resistance followed, led by the Democratic Opposition of Serbia (DOS), a broad coalition of anti-Milošević parties. This culminated on 5 October when half a million people from all over the country congregated in Belgrade, compelling Milošević to concede defeat. The fall of Milošević ended Yugoslavia's international isolation. Milošević was sent to the International Criminal Tribunal for the former Yugoslavia. The DOS announced that FR Yugoslavia would seek to join the European Union. In 2003, the Federal Republic of Yugoslavia was renamed Serbia and Montenegro; the EU opened negotiations with the country for the Stabilisation and Association Agreement. Serbia's political climate remained tense and in 2003, the Prime Minister Zoran Đinđić was assassinated as result of a plot originating from circles of organised crime and former security officials. In 2004 unrest in Kosovo took place, leaving 19 people dead and a number of Serbian Orthodox churches and monasteries destroyed or damaged.

Contemporary period

On 21 May 2006, Montenegro held a referendum to determine whether to end its union with Serbia. The results showed 55.4% of voters in favour of independence, which was just above the 55% required by the referendum. This was followed on 5 June 2006 by Serbia's declaration of independence, marking the final dissolution of the State Union of Serbia and Montenegro, and the re-emergence of Serbia as an independent state, for the first time since 1918. On the same occasion, the National Assembly of Serbia declared Serbia to be the legal successor to the former state union. 

The Assembly of Kosovo unilaterally declared independence from Serbia on 17 February 2008. Serbia immediately condemned the declaration and continues to deny any statehood to Kosovo. The declaration has sparked varied responses from the international community, some welcoming it, while others condemned the unilateral move. Status-neutral talks between Serbia and Kosovo-Albanian authorities are held in Brussels, mediated by the EU.

Serbia officially applied for membership in the European Union on 22 December 2009, and received candidate status on 1 March 2012, following a delay in December 2011. Following a positive recommendation of the European Commission and European Council in June 2013, negotiations to join the EU commenced in January 2014.

Since Aleksandar Vučić and his Serbian Progressive Party came to power in 2012, Serbia has suffered from democratic backsliding into authoritarianism, followed by a decline in media freedom and civil liberties. After the COVID-19 pandemic spread to Serbia in March 2020, a state of emergency was declared and a curfew was introduced for the first time in Serbia since World War II. In January and February 2021, Serbia carried the second-fastest vaccine rollout in Europe. In April 2022, President Aleksandar Vučić was re-elected.

Geography

A landlocked country situated at the crossroads between Central and Southern Europe, Serbia is located in the Balkan peninsula and the Pannonian Plain. Its total border length amounts to : Albania , Bosnia and Herzegovina , Bulgaria , Croatia , Hungary , North Macedonia , Montenegro  and Romania . All of Kosovo's border with Albania, North Macedonia and Montenegro are under control of the Kosovo border police.
The Pannonian Plain covers the northern third of the country (Vojvodina and Mačva) while the easternmost tip of Serbia extends into the Wallachian Plain. 
The terrain of the central part of the country, with the region of Šumadija at its heart, consists chiefly of hills traversed by rivers. Mountains dominate the southern third of Serbia. Dinaric Alps stretch in the west and the southwest, following the flow of the rivers Drina and Ibar. The Carpathian Mountains and Balkan Mountains stretch in a north–south direction in eastern Serbia.

Ancient mountains in the southeast corner of the country belong to the Rilo-Rhodope Mountain system. The largest lake is Đerdap Lake and the longest river passing through Serbia is the Danube.

Climate

The climate of Serbia is under the influences of the landmass of Eurasia and the Atlantic Ocean and Mediterranean Sea. In the north, the climate is more continental, with cold winters, and hot, humid summers along with well-distributed rainfall patterns. In the south, summers and autumns are drier, and winters are relatively cold, with heavy inland snowfall in the mountains.

Differences in elevation, proximity to the Adriatic Sea and large river basins, as well as exposure to the winds account for climate variations. Southern Serbia is subject to Mediterranean influences. The Dinaric Alps and other mountain ranges contribute to the cooling of most of the warm air masses. Winters are quite harsh in the Pešter plateau, because of the mountains which encircle it. One of the climatic features of Serbia is Košava, a cold and very squally southeastern wind which starts in the Carpathian Mountains and follows the Danube northwest through the Iron Gate where it gains a jet effect and continues to Belgrade and can spread as far south as Niš.

Serbia is one of few European countries with very high risk exposure to natural hazards (earthquakes, storms, floods, droughts). It is estimated that potential floods, particularly in areas of Central Serbia, threaten over 500 larger settlements and an area of 16,000 square kilometres. The most disastrous were the floods in May 2014, when 57 people died and a damage of over a 1.5 billion euro was inflicted.

Hydrology

Almost all of Serbia's rivers drain to the Black Sea, by way of the Danube river. The Danube, the second largest European river, passes through Serbia with 588 kilometres (21% of its overall length) and represents the major source of fresh water. One notable exception is the Pčinja which flows into the Aegean. Drina river forms the natural border between Bosnia and Herzegovina and Serbia, and represents the main kayaking and rafting attraction in both countries.

Due to configuration of the terrain, natural lakes are sparse and small; most of them are located in the lowlands of Vojvodina, like the aeolian lake Palić or numerous oxbow lakes along river flows (like Zasavica and Carska Bara). The largest waterfall, Jelovarnik, located in Kopaonik, is 71 m high. Abundance of relatively unpolluted surface waters and numerous underground natural and mineral water sources of high water quality presents a chance for export and economy improvement; however, more extensive exploitation and production of bottled water began only recently.

Environment
 

Serbia is a country of rich ecosystem and species diversity—covering only 1.9% of the whole European territory, Serbia is home to 39% of European vascular flora, 51% of European fish fauna, 40% of European reptiles and amphibian fauna, 74% of European bird fauna, and 67% European mammal fauna. Its abundance of mountains and rivers make it an ideal environment for a variety of animals, many of which are protected including wolves, lynx, bears, foxes, and stags. There are 17 snake species living all over the country, 8 of them are venomous. 

Mountain of Tara in western Serbia is one of the last regions in Europe where bears can still live in absolute freedom. Serbia is home to about 380 species of birds. In Carska Bara, there are over 300 bird species on just a few square 
kilometres. Uvac Gorge is considered one of the last habitats of the Griffon vulture in Europe. In area around the city of Kikinda, in the northernmost part of the country, some 145 endangered long-eared owls are noted, making it the world's biggest settlement of these species. The country is considerably rich with threatened species of bats and butterflies as well.

There are 380 protected areas of Serbia, encompassing 4,947 square kilometres or 6.4% of the country. The "Spatial plan of the Republic of Serbia" states that the total protected area should be increased to 12% by 2021. Those protected areas include 5 national parks (Đerdap, Tara, Kopaonik, Fruška Gora and Šar Mountain), 15 nature parks, 15 "landscapes of outstanding features", 61 nature reserves, and 281 natural monuments.

With 29.1% of its territory covered by forest, Serbia is considered to be a middle-forested country, compared on a global scale to world forest coverage at 30%, and European average of 35%. The total forest area in Serbia is 2,252,000 ha (1,194,000 ha or 53% are state-owned, and 1,058,387 ha or 47% are privately owned) or 0.3 ha per inhabitant. It had a 2019 Forest Landscape Integrity Index mean score of 5.29/10, ranking it 105th globally out of 172 countries. The most common trees are oak, beech, pines, and firs. 

Air pollution is a significant problem in Bor area, due to work of large copper mining and smelting complex, and Pančevo where oil and petrochemical industry is based. Some cities suffer from water supply problems, due to mismanagement and low investments in the past, as well as water pollution (like the pollution of the Ibar River from the Trepča zinc-lead combinate, affecting the city of Kraljevo, or the presence of natural arsenic in underground waters in Zrenjanin).

Poor waste management has been identified as one of the most important environmental problems in Serbia and the recycling is a fledgling activity, with only 15% of its waste being turned back for reuse. The 1999 NATO bombing caused serious damage to the environment, with several thousand tonnes of toxic chemicals stored in targeted factories and refineries released into the soil and water basins.

Politics
 
Serbia is a parliamentary republic, with the government divided into legislative, executive, and judiciary branches.
Serbia had one of the first modern constitutions in Europe, the 1835 Constitution (known as the Sretenje Constitution), which was at the time considered among the most progressive and liberal constitutions in Europe. Since then it has adopted 10 different constitutions. The current constitution was adopted in 2006 in the aftermath of the Montenegro independence referendum which by consequence renewed the independence of Serbia itself. The Constitutional Court rules on matters regarding the Constitution.

The President of the Republic (Predsednik Republike) is the head of state, is elected by popular vote to a five-year term and is limited by the Constitution to a maximum of two terms. In addition to being the commander in chief of the armed forces, the president has the procedural duty of appointing the prime minister with the consent of the parliament, and has some influence on foreign policy. Aleksandar Vučić of the Serbian Progressive Party is the current president following the 2017 presidential election. Seat of the presidency is Novi Dvor.

The Government (Vlada) is composed of the prime minister and cabinet ministers. The Government is responsible for proposing legislation and a budget, executing the laws, and guiding the foreign and internal policies. The current prime minister is Ana Brnabić, nominated by the Serbian Progressive Party.

The National Assembly (Narodna skupština) is a unicameral legislative body. The National Assembly has the power to enact laws, approve the budget, schedule presidential elections, select and dismiss the Prime Minister and other ministers, declare war, and ratify international treaties and agreements. It is composed of 250 proportionally elected members who serve four-year terms. Following the 2020 parliamentary election, the largest political parties in the National Assembly are the populist Serbian Progressive Party and Socialist Party of Serbia, that with its partners, hold more than a supermajority number of seats.

In 2021, Serbia was the 5th country in Europe by the number of women holding high-ranking public functions.

Law and criminal justice

Serbia is the fourth modern-day European country, after France, Austria and the Netherlands, to have a codified legal system.

The country has a three-tiered judicial system, made up of the Supreme Court of Cassation as the court of the last resort, Courts of Appeal as the appellate instance, and Basic and High courts as the general jurisdictions at first instance.

Courts of special jurisdictions are the Administrative Court, commercial courts (including the Commercial Court of Appeal at second instance) and misdemeanor courts (including High Misdemeanor Court at second instance). The judiciary is overseen by the Ministry of Justice. Serbia has a typical civil law legal system.

Law enforcement is the responsibility of the Serbian Police, which is subordinate to the Ministry of the Interior. Serbian Police fields 27,363 uniformed officers.
National security and counterintelligence are the responsibility of the Security Intelligence Agency (BIA).

Foreign relations

Serbia has established diplomatic relations with 191 UN member states, the Holy See, the Sovereign Military Order of Malta and the European Union. Foreign relations are conducted through the Ministry of Foreign Affairs. Serbia has a network of 65 embassies and 23 consulates internationally. There are 69 foreign embassies, 5 consulates and 4 liaison offices in Serbia.
Serbian foreign policy is focused on achieving the strategic goal of becoming a member state of the European Union (EU). Serbia started the process of joining the EU by signing of the Stabilisation and Association Agreement on 29 April 2008 and officially applied for membership in the European Union on 22 December 2009. It received a full candidate status on 1 March 2012 and started accession talks on 21 January 2014. The European Commission considers accession possible by 2025.

On 17 February 2008, Kosovo unilaterally declared independence from Serbia. In protest, Serbia initially recalled its ambassadors from countries that recognised Kosovo's independence. The resolution of 26 December 2007 by the National Assembly stated that both the Kosovo declaration of independence and recognition thereof by any state would be gross violation of international law.

Serbia began cooperation and dialogue with NATO in 2006, when the country joined the Partnership for Peace programme and the Euro-Atlantic Partnership Council. The country's military neutrality was formally proclaimed by a resolution adopted by Serbia's parliament in December 2007, which makes joining any military alliance contingent on a popular referendum, a stance acknowledged by NATO. On the other hand, Serbia's relations with Russia are habitually described by mass media as a "centuries-old religious, ethnic and political alliance" and Russia is said to have sought to solidify its relationship with Serbia since the imposition of sanctions against Russia in 2014. During the 2022 Russian invasion of Ukraine, Serbia voted to condemn the invasion, supporting the adoption of the United Nations draft resolution demanding Russia to withdraw its military forces from Ukraine.

Military

The Serbian Armed Forces are subordinate to the Ministry of Defence, and are composed of the Army and the Air Force. Although a landlocked country, Serbia operates a River Flotilla which patrols on the Danube, Sava and Tisa rivers. The Serbian Chief of the General Staff reports to the Defence Minister. The Chief of Staff is appointed by the president, who is the commander-in-chief. , Serbian defence budget amounts to $804 million.

Traditionally having relied on a large number of conscripts, Serbian Armed Forces went through a period of downsizing, restructuring and professionalisation. Conscription was abolished in 2011. Serbian Armed Forces have 28,000 active troops, supplemented by the "active reserve" which numbers 20,000 members and "passive reserve" with about 170,000.

Serbia participates in the NATO Individual Partnership Action Plan programme, but has no intention of joining NATO, due to significant popular rejection, largely a legacy of the NATO bombing of Yugoslavia in 1999. It is an observer member of the Collective Security Treaty Organisation (CSTO) The country also signed the Stability Pact for South Eastern Europe. The Serbian Armed Forces take part in several multinational peacekeeping missions, including deployments in Lebanon, Cyprus, Ivory Coast, and Liberia.

Serbia is a major producer and exporter of military equipment in the region. Defence exports totaled around $600 million in 2018. The defence industry has seen significant growth over the years and it continues to grow on a yearly basis.

Serbia is one of the countries with the largest number of firearms in the civilian population in the world.

Administrative divisions

Serbia is a unitary state composed of municipalities/cities, districts, and two autonomous provinces. In Serbia, excluding Kosovo, there are 145 municipalities (opštine) and 29 cities (gradovi), which form the basic units of local self-government. Apart from municipalities/cities, there are 24 districts (okruzi, 10 most populated listed below), with the City of Belgrade constituting an additional district. Except for Belgrade, which has an elected local government, districts are regional centres of state authority, but have no powers of their own; they present purely administrative divisions.
The Constitution of Serbia recognizes two autonomous provinces, Vojvodina in the north, and the disputed territory of Kosovo and Metohija in the south, while the remaining area of Central Serbia never had its own regional authority. Following the Kosovo War, UN peacekeepers entered Kosovo and Metohija, as per UNSC Resolution 1244. The government of Serbia does not recognise Kosovo's February 2008 declaration of independence, considering it illegal and illegitimate.

Demographics

 census, Serbia (excluding Kosovo) has a total population of 7,186,862 and the overall population density is medium as it stands at 92.8 inhabitants per square kilometre. The census was not conducted in Kosovo which held its own census that numbered their total population at 1,739,825, excluding Serb-inhabited North Kosovo, as Serbs from that area (about 50,000) boycotted the census.

Serbia has been enduring a demographic crisis since the beginning of the 1990s, with a death rate that has continuously exceeded its birth rate. It is estimated that 300,000 people left Serbia during the 1990s, 20% of whom had a higher education. Serbia subsequently has one of the oldest populations in the world, with the average age of 43.3 years, and its population is shrinking at one of the fastest rates in the world. A fifth of all households consist of only one person, and just one-fourth of four and more persons. Average life expectancy in Serbia at birth is 76.1 years.

During the 1990s, Serbia had the largest refugee population in Europe. Refugees and internally displaced persons (IDPs) in Serbia formed between 7% and 7.5% of its population at the time – about half a million refugees sought refuge in the country following the series of Yugoslav wars, mainly from Croatia (and to a lesser extent from Bosnia and Herzegovina) and the IDPs from Kosovo.

Serbs with 5,988,150 are the largest ethnic group in Serbia, representing 83% of the total population (excluding Kosovo). Serbia is one of the European countries with the highest number of registered national minorities, while the province of Vojvodina is recognizable for its multi-ethnic and multi-cultural identity. With a population of 253,899, Hungarians are the largest ethnic minority in Serbia, concentrated predominantly in northern Vojvodina and representing 3.5% of the country's population (13% in Vojvodina). Romani population stands at 147,604 according to the 2011 census but unofficial estimates place their actual number between 400,000 and 500,000. Bosniaks with 145,278 are concentrated in Raška (Sandžak), in the southwest. Other minority groups include Croats, Slovaks, Albanians, Montenegrins, Romanians and Vlachs, Macedonians and Bulgarians. Chinese, estimated at 15,000, are the only significant non-European immigrant minority.

The majority of the population, or 59.4%, reside in urban areas and some 16.1% in Belgrade alone. Belgrade is the only city with more than a million inhabitants and there are four more with over 100,000 inhabitants.

Religion

The Constitution of Serbia defines it as a secular state with guaranteed religious freedom. Orthodox Christians with 6,079,396 comprise 84.5% of country's population. The Serbian Orthodox Church is the largest and traditional church of the country, adherents of which are overwhelmingly Serbs. Other Orthodox Christian communities in Serbia include Montenegrins, Romanians, Vlachs, Macedonians and Bulgarians.

In 2011, Roman Catholics numbered 356,957 in Serbia, or roughly 6% of the population, mostly in northern Vojvodina which is home to ethnic minority groups such as Hungarians, Croats, and Bunjevci, as well as to some Slovaks and Czechs.

Protestantism accounts for about 1% of the country's population, chiefly Lutheranism among Slovaks in Vojvodina as well as Calvinism among Reformed Hungarians. Greek Catholic Church is adhered by around 25,000 citizens (0.37% of the population), mostly Rusyns in Vojvodina.

Muslims, with 222,282 or 3% of the population, form the third largest religious group. Islam has a strong historic following in the southern regions of Serbia, primarily in southern Raška. Bosniaks are the largest Islamic community in Serbia, followed by Albanians; estimates are that around a third of the country's Roma people are Muslim.

In 2011, there were only 578 Jews in Serbia, compared to over 30,000 prior to World War II. Atheists numbered 80,053, or 1.1% of the population, and an additional 4,070 declared themselves to be agnostics.

Language

The official language is Serbian, native to 88% of the population. Serbian is the only European language with active digraphia, using both Cyrillic and Latin alphabets. Serbian Cyrillic is designated in the Constitution as the "official script" and was devised in 1814 by Serbian philologist Vuk Karadžić, who based it on phonemic principles. A survey from 2014 showed that 47% of Serbians favour the Latin alphabet, 36% favour the Cyrillic one and 17% have no preference.

Standard Serbian is based on the most widespread Shtokavian dialect (more specifically on the dialects of Šumadija-Vojvodina and Eastern Herzegovina).

Recognised minority languages are: Hungarian, Bosnian, Slovak, Croatian, Albanian, Romanian, Bulgarian, Rusyn, and Macedonian. All these languages are in official use in municipalities or cities where the ethnic minority exceeds 15% of the total population. In Vojvodina, the provincial administration uses, besides Serbian, five other languages (Slovak, Hungarian, Croatian, Romanian and Rusyn).

Healthcare

The healthcare system in Serbia is organized and managed by the three primary institutions: The Ministry of Health, The Institute of Public Health of Serbia "Dr Milan Jovanović Batut" and the Military Medical Academy. The right to healthcare protections is defined as a constitutional right in Serbia. The Serbian public health system is based on the principles of equity and solidarity, organized on the model of compulsory health insurance contributions. Private health care is not integrated into the public health system, but certain services may be included by contracting.

The Ministry of Health determines the healthcare policy and adopts standards for the work of the healthcare service. The Ministry is also in charge of the health care system, health insurance, preservation and improvement of health of citizens, health inspection, supervision over the work of the healthcare service and other tasks in the field of health care.

The Institute of Public Health of Serbia "Dr Milan Jovanović Batut" is responsible for medical statistics, epidemiology and hygiene. This central, tertiary institution manages and coordinates a dense network of municipal and regional Centers of Public Health, spread across the entire country, that provide services in the domain of epidemiology and hygiene on the primary and secondary level. The Republic Health Insurance Institute finances the functioning of health care at all levels.

One of the most important health institutions in Serbia is the Military Medical Academy in Belgrade. It takes care of about 30,000 patients a year (military and civilian insured). The Academy performs around 30,000 surgical interventions and more than 500,000 specialist examinations.

The Clinical Centre of Serbia spreads over 34 hectares in Belgrade and consists of about 50 buildings, while also has 3,150 beds considered to be the highest number in Europe, and among highest in the world.

Other important health institutions include: KBC Dr Dragiša Mišović, Cardiovascular institute Detinje, Clinical Centre of Kragujevac, Clinical Centre of Niš, Clinical Center of Vojvodina and others.

Medical specialists from Serbia have performed a number of operations which have been described as "pioneer works".

Economy

Serbia has an emerging market economy in upper-middle income range. According to the International Monetary Fund, Serbian nominal GDP in 2022 is officially estimated at $65.697 billion or $9,561 per capita while purchasing power parity GDP stood at $153.076 billion or $22,278 per capita. The economy is dominated by services which accounts for 67.9% of GDP, followed by industry with 26.1% of GDP, and agriculture at 6% of GDP. The official currency of Serbia is Serbian dinar (ISO code: RSD), and the central bank is National Bank of Serbia. The Belgrade Stock Exchange is the only stock exchange in the country, with market capitalisation of $8.65 billion and BELEX15 as the main index representing the 15 most liquid stocks. The country is ranked 52nd on the Social Progress Index as well as 51st on the Global Peace Index.

The economy has been affected by the global economic crisis. After almost a decade of strong economic growth (average of 4.45% per year), Serbia entered the recession in 2009 with negative growth of −3% and again in 2012 and 2014 with −1% and −1.8%, respectively. As the government was fighting effects of crisis the public debt has more than doubled: from pre-crisis level of just under 30% to about 70% of GDP and trending downwards recently to around 50%. Labour force stands at 3.2 million, with 56% employed in services sector, 28.1% in industry and 15.9% in the agriculture. The average monthly net salary in May 2019 stood at 47,575 dinars or $525. The unemployment remains an acute problem, with rate of 12.7% .

Since 2000, Serbia has attracted over $40 billion in foreign direct investment (FDI). Blue-chip corporations making investments include: Fiat Chrysler Automobiles, Siemens, Bosch, Philip Morris, Michelin, Coca-Cola, Carlsberg and others. In the energy sector, Russian energy giants, Gazprom and Lukoil have made large investments. In metallurgy sector, Chinese steel and copper giants, Hesteel and Zijin Mining have acquired key complexes.

Serbia has an unfavourable trade balance: imports exceed exports by 25%. Serbia's exports, however, recorded a steady growth in last couple of years reaching $19.2 billion in 2018. The country has free trade agreements with the EFTA and CEFTA, a preferential trade regime with the European Union, a Generalised System of Preferences with the United States, and individual free trade agreements with Russia, Belarus, Kazakhstan, and Turkey.

Agriculture

Serbia has very favourable natural conditions (land and climate) for varied agricultural production. It has 5,056,000 ha of agricultural land (0.7 ha per capita), out of which 3,294,000 ha is arable land (0.45 ha per capita). In 2016, Serbia exported agricultural and food products worth $3.2 billion, and the export-import ratio was 178%. Agricultural exports constitute more than one-fifth of all Serbia's sales on the world market. Serbia is one of the largest provider of frozen fruit to the EU (largest to the French market, and 2nd largest to the German market). 

Agricultural production is most prominent in Vojvodina on the fertile Pannonian Plain. Other agricultural regions include Mačva, Pomoravlje, Tamnava, Rasina, and Jablanica.

In the structure of the agricultural production, 70% is from the crop field production and 30% is from the livestock production. Serbia is world's second largest producer of plums (582,485 tonnes; second to China), second largest of raspberries (89,602 tonnes, second to Poland), it is also a significant producer of maize (6.48 million tonnes, ranked 32nd in the world) and wheat (2.07 million tonnes, ranked 35th in the world). Other important agricultural products are: sunflower, sugar beet, soybean, potato, apple, pork meat, beef, poultry and dairy.

There are 56,000 ha of vineyards in Serbia, producing about 230 million litres of wine annually. The most famous viticulture regions are located in Vojvodina and Šumadija.

Industry

The industry was the economic sector hardest hit by the UN sanctions and trade embargo and NATO bombing during the 1990s and transition to market economy during the 2000s. The industrial output saw dramatic downsizing: in 2013 it was expected to be only a half of that of 1989. Main industrial sectors include: automotive, mining, non-ferrous metals, food-processing, electronics, pharmaceuticals, clothes. Serbia has 14 free economic zones as of September 2017, in which many foreign direct investments are realised.

Automotive industry (with Fiat Chrysler Automobiles as a forebearer) is dominated by cluster located in Kragujevac and its vicinity, and contributes to export with about $2 billion. Country is a leading steel producer in the wider region of Southeast Europe and had production of nearly 2 million tonnes of raw steel in 2018, coming entirely from Smederevo steel mill, owned by the Chinese Hesteel. Serbia's mining industry is comparatively strong: Serbia is the 18th largest producer of coal (7th in Europe) extracted from large deposits in Kolubara and Kostolac basins; it is also world's 23rd largest (3rd in Europe) producer of copper which is extracted by Zijin Bor Copper, a large copper mining company, acquired by Chinese Zijin Mining in 2018; significant gold extraction is developed around Majdanpek. Serbia notably manufactures intel smartphones named Tesla smartphones.

Food industry is well known both regionally and internationally and is one of the strong points of the economy. Some of the international brand-names established production in Serbia: PepsiCo and Nestlé in food-processing sector; Coca-Cola (Belgrade), Heineken (Novi Sad) and Carlsberg (Bačka Palanka) in beverage industry; Nordzucker in sugar industry. Serbia's electronics industry had its peak in the 1980s and the industry today is only a third of what it was back then, but has witnessed a something of revival in last decade with investments of companies such as Siemens (wind turbines) in Subotica, Panasonic (lighting devices) in Svilajnac, and Gorenje (electrical home appliances) in Valjevo. The pharmaceutical industry in Serbia comprises a dozen manufacturers of generic drugs, of which Hemofarm in Vršac and Galenika in Belgrade, account for 80% of production volume. Domestic production meets over 60% of the local demand.

Energy

The energy sector is one of the largest and most important sectors to the country's economy. Serbia is a net exporter of electricity and importer of key fuels (such as oil and gas).

Serbia has an abundance of coal, and significant reserves of oil and gas. Serbia's proven reserves of 5.5 billion tonnes of coal lignite are the fifth largest in the world (second in Europe, after Germany). Coal is found in two large deposits: Kolubara (4 billion tonnes of reserves) and Kostolac (1.5 billion tonnes). Despite being small on a world scale, Serbia's oil and gas resources (77.4 million tonnes of oil equivalent and 48.1 billion cubic metres, respectively) have a certain regional importance since they are largest in the region of former Yugoslavia as well as the Balkans (excluding Romania). Almost 90% of the discovered oil and gas are to be found in Banat and those oil and gas fields are by size among the largest in the Pannonian basin but are average on a European scale.

The production of electricity in 2015 in Serbia was 36.5 billion kilowatt-hours (KWh), while the final electricity consumption amounted to 35.5 billion kilowatt-hours (KWh). Most of the electricity produced comes from thermal-power plants (72.7% of all electricity) and to a lesser degree from hydroelectric-power plants (27.3%). There are 6 lignite-operated thermal-power plants with an installed power of 3,936 MW; largest of which are 1,502 MW-Nikola Tesla 1 and 1,160 MW-Nikola Tesla 2, both in Obrenovac. Total installed power of 9 hydroelectric-power plants is 2,831 MW, largest of which is Đerdap 1 with capacity of 1,026 MW. In addition to this, there are mazute and gas-operated thermal-power plants with an installed power of 353 MW. The entire production of electricity is concentrated in Elektroprivreda Srbije (EPS), public electric-utility power company.

The current oil production in Serbia amounts to over 1.1 million tonnes of oil equivalent and satisfies some 43% of country's needs while the rest is imported. National petrol company, Naftna Industrija Srbije (NIS), was acquired in 2008 by Gazprom Neft. The company's refinery in Pančevo (capacity of 4.8 million tonnes) is one of the most modern oil-refineries in Europe; it also operates network of 334 filling stations in Serbia (74% of domestic market) and additional 36 stations in Bosnia and Herzegovina, 31 in Bulgaria, and 28 in Romania. There are 155 kilometres of crude oil pipelines connecting Pančevo and Novi Sad refineries as a part of trans-national Adria oil pipeline.

Serbia is heavily dependent on foreign sources of natural gas, with only 17% coming from domestic production (totalling 491 million cubic metres in 2012) and the rest is imported, mainly from Russia (via gas pipelines that run through Ukraine and Hungary). Srbijagas, public company, operates the natural gas transportation system which comprise  of trunk and regional natural gas pipelines and a 450 million cubic metre underground gas storage facility at Banatski Dvor. In 2021, Balkan Stream gas pipeline opened through Serbia.

Transport

Serbia has a strategic transportation location since the country's backbone, Morava Valley, represents the easiest land route from continental Europe to Asia Minor and the Near East.

Serbian road network carries the bulk of traffic in the country. The road network, except for the most of class-IA roads, are of comparatively lower quality to the Western European standards because of lack of financial resources for their maintenance in the last 20 years.

Over  of new motorways were constructed in the last decade and additional  are currently under construction: A5 motorway (from north of Kruševac to Čačak) and -long segment of A2 (between Čačak and Požega). Coach transport is very extensive: almost every place in the country is connected by bus, from largest cities to the villages; in addition there are international routes (mainly to countries of Western Europe with large Serb diaspora). Routes, both domestic and international, are served by more than hundred intercity coach services, biggest of which are Lasta and Niš-Ekspres. , there were 1,999,771 registered passenger cars or 1 passenger car per 3.5 inhabitants.

The major rail hub is Belgrade (and to a lesser degree Niš), while the most important railroads include: Belgrade–Subotica–Budapest (Hungary) (currently upgraded to high-speed status), Belgrade–Bar (Montenegro), Belgrade–Šid–Zagreb (Croatia)/Belgrade–Niš–Sofia (Bulgaria) (part of Pan-European Corridor X), and Niš–Thessaloniki (Greece). Some 75 km (46 mi) of new high-speed rail line between Belgrade and Novi Sad was opened in 2022 and additional 108 km (67 mi) from Novi Sad to Subotica and border with Hungary are currently under construction and due to open in 2025. Construction work for 212 km-long prolongation of the high-speed rail line to the south, to the city of Niš, is set to commence in 2024 and with its planned completion by the end of the decade four of country's five largest cities will be connected by the high-speed rail lines. Rail services are operated by Srbija Voz (passenger transport) and Srbija Kargo (freight transport).

There are three airports with regular passenger services reaching over 6 million passengers in 2022 with Belgrade Nikola Tesla Airport serving bulk of it, being a hub of flagship carrier Air Serbia which flies to 80 destinations in 32 countries (including intercontinental flights to New York City, Chicago and Tianjin) and carried 2.75 million passengers in 2022.

The most important inland waterway is the Danube (part of Pan-European Corridor VII). Other navigable rivers include Sava, Tisza, Begej and Timiş Rivers, all of which connect Serbia with Northern and Western Europe through the Rhine–Main–Danube Canal and North Sea route, to Eastern Europe via the Tisza, Begej and Danube Black Sea routes, and to Southern Europe via the Sava river. More than 8 million tonnes of cargo were transported on Serbian rivers and canals in 2018 while the largest river ports are: Novi Sad, Belgrade, Pančevo, Smederevo, Prahovo and Šabac.

Telecommunications

Fixed telephone lines connect 81% of households in Serbia, and with about 9.1 million users the number of cellphones surpasses the total population of by 28%. The largest mobile operator is Telekom Srbija with 4.2 million subscribers, followed by Telenor with 2.8 million users and A1 with about 2 million. Some 58% of households have fixed-line (non-mobile) broadband Internet connection while 67% are provided with pay television services (i.e. 38% cable television, 17% IPTV, and 10% satellite). Digital television transition has been completed in 2015 with DVB-T2 standard for signal transmission.

Tourism

Serbia is not a mass-tourism destination but nevertheless has a diverse range of touristic products. In 2019, total of over 3.6 million tourists were recorded in accommodations, of which half were foreign. Foreign exchange earnings from tourism were estimated at $1.5 billion.

Tourism is mainly focused on the mountains and spas of the country, which are mostly visited by domestic tourists, as well as Belgrade and, to a lesser degree, Novi Sad, which are preferred choices of foreign tourists (almost two-thirds of all foreign visits are made to these two cities). The most famous mountain resorts are Kopaonik, Stara Planina and Zlatibor. There are also many spas in Serbia, the biggest of which are Vrnjačka Banja, Soko Banja, and Banja Koviljača. City-break and conference tourism is developed in Belgrade and Novi Sad. Other touristic products that Serbia offer are natural wonders like Đavolja varoš, Christian pilgrimage to the many Orthodox monasteries across the country and the river cruising along the Danube. There are several internationally popular music festivals held in Serbia, such as EXIT (with 25–30,000 foreign visitors coming from 60 countries) and the Guča trumpet festival.

Education and science

According to 2011 census, literacy in Serbia stands at 98% of population while computer literacy is at 49% (complete computer literacy is at 34.2%). Same census showed the following levels of education: 16.2% of inhabitants have higher education (10.6% have bachelors or master's degrees, 5.6% have an associate degree), 49% have a secondary education, 20.7% have an elementary education, and 13.7% have not completed elementary education.

Education in Serbia is regulated by the Ministry of Education and Science. Education starts in either preschools or elementary schools. Children enroll in elementary schools at the age of seven. Compulsory education consists of eight grades of elementary school. Students have the opportunity to attend gymnasiums and vocational schools for another four years, or to enroll in vocational training for 2 to 3 years. Following the completion of gymnasiums or vocational schools, students have the opportunity to attend university. Elementary and secondary education are also available in languages of recognised minorities in Serbia, where classes are held in Hungarian, Slovak, Albanian, Romanian, Rusyn, Bulgarian as well as Bosnian and Croatian languages. Petnica Science Center is a notable institution for extracurricular science education focusing on gifted students.

There are 19 universities in Serbia (nine public universities with a total number of 86 faculties and ten private universities with 51 faculties). In 2018/2019 academic year, 210,480 students attended 19 universities (181,310 at public universities and some 29,170 at private universities) while 47,169 attended 81 "higher schools". Public universities in Serbia are: the University of Belgrade (oldest, founded in 1808, and largest university with 97,696 undergraduates and graduates), University of Novi Sad (founded in 1960 and with student body of 42,489), University of Niš (founded in 1965; 20,559 students), University of Kragujevac (founded in 1976; 14,053 students), University of Priština (located in North Mitrovica), Public University of Novi Pazar as well as three specialist universities – University of Arts, University of Defence and University of Criminal Investigation and Police Studies. Largest private universities include Megatrend University and Singidunum University, both in Belgrade, and Educons University in Novi Sad. The University of Belgrade (placed in 301–400 bracket on 2013 Shanghai Ranking of World Universities, being best-placed university in Southeast Europe after those in Athens and Thessaloniki) and University of Novi Sad are generally considered the best institutions of higher learning in the country.

Serbia spent 0.9% of GDP on scientific research in 2017, which is slightly below the European average. Serbia was ranked 54th in the Global Innovation Index in 2021, up from 57th in 2019. Since 2018, Serbia is a full member of CERN. Serbia has a long history of excellence in maths and computer sciences which has created a strong pool of engineering talent, although economic sanctions during the 1990s and chronic underinvestment in research forced many scientific professionals to leave the country. Nevertheless, there are several areas in which Serbia still excels such as growing information technology sector, which includes software development as well as outsourcing. It generated over $1.2 billion in exports in 2018, both from international investors and a significant number of dynamic homegrown enterprises. Serbia is one of the countries with the highest proportion of women in science.
Among the scientific institutes operating in Serbia, the largest are the Mihajlo Pupin Institute and Vinča Nuclear Institute, both in Belgrade. The Serbian Academy of Sciences and Arts is a learned society promoting science and arts from its inception in 1841.

Culture

For centuries straddling the boundaries between East and West, the territory of Serbia had been divided among the Eastern and Western halves of the Roman Empire; then between Byzantium and the Kingdom of Hungary; and in the early modern period between the Ottoman Empire and the Habsburg Empire. These overlapping influences have resulted in cultural varieties throughout Serbia; its north leans to the profile of Central Europe, while the south is characteristic of the wider Balkans and even the Mediterranean. The Byzantine influence on Serbia was profound, first through the introduction of Eastern Christianity in the Early Middle Ages. The Serbian Orthodox Church has many monasteries built in the Serbian Middle Ages. Serbia was influenced by the Republic of Venice as well, mainly though trade, literature and romanesque architecture.

Serbia has five cultural monuments inscribed in the list of UNESCO World Heritage: the early medieval capital Stari Ras and the 13th-century monastery Sopoćani; the 12th-century Studenica monastery; the Roman complex of Gamzigrad–Felix Romuliana; medieval tombstones Stećci; and finally the endangered Medieval Monuments in Kosovo (the monasteries of Visoki Dečani, Our Lady of Ljeviš, Gračanica and Patriarchal Monastery of Peć).

There are two literary works on UNESCO's Memory of the World Programme: the 12th-century Miroslav Gospel, and scientist Nikola Tesla's archive. The slava (patron saint veneration), kolo (traditional folk dance), singing to the accompaniment of the gusle and Zlakusa pottery are inscribed on UNESCO Intangible Cultural Heritage Lists. The Ministry of Culture and Information is tasked with preserving the nation's cultural heritage and overseeing its development, with further activities undertaken by local governments.

Art and architecture

Traces of Roman and early Byzantine Empire architectural heritage are found in many royal cities and palaces in Serbia, such as Sirmium, Felix Romuliana and Justiniana Prima, since 535 the seat of the Archbishopric of Justiniana Prima.

Serbian monasteries were under the influence of Byzantine Art, particularly after the fall of Constantinople in 1204 when many Byzantine artists fled to Serbia. The monasteries include Studenica (built around 1190), which was a model for such later monasteries as Mileševa, Sopoćani, Žiča, Gračanica and Visoki Dečani. Numerous monuments and cultural sites were destroyed at various stages of Serbian history, including destruction in Kosovo. In the late 14th and the 15th centuries, an autochthonous architectural style known as Morava style evolved in the area around Morava Valley. A characteristic of this style was the wealthy decoration of the frontal church walls. Examples of this include Manasija, Ravanica and Kalenić monasteries. 

Frescos include White Angel (Mileševa monastery), Crucifixion (Studenica monastery) and Dormition of the Virgin (Sopoćani).

The country is dotted with many well-preserved medieval fortifications and castles such as Smederevo Fortress (largest lowland fortress in Europe), Golubac, Maglič, Soko grad, Belgrade Fortress, Ostrvica and Ram.

Under Ottoman occupation, Serbian art was virtually non-existent outside the lands ruled by the Habsburg monarchy. Traditional Serbian art showed Baroque influences at the end of the 18th century as shown in the works of Nikola Nešković, Teodor Kračun, Zaharije Orfelin and Jakov Orfelin.

Serbian painting showed the influence of Biedermeier and Neoclassicism as seen in works by Konstantin Danil, Arsenije Teodorović and Pavel Đurković. Many painters followed the artistic trends set in the 19th century Romanticism, notably Đura Jakšić, Stevan Todorović, Katarina Ivanović and Novak Radonić.

Serbian painters of the first half of the 20th century include Paja Jovanović and Uroš Predić of Realism, Cubist Sava Šumanović, Milena Pavlović-Barili and Nadežda Petrović of Impressionism, Expressionist Milan Konjović. Painters of the second half of 20th century include Marko Čelebonović, Petar Lubarda, Milo Milunović, Ljubomir Popović and Vladimir Veličković.

Anastas Jovanović was one of the earliest photographers in the world. Marina Abramović is a performance artist. Pirot carpet is a traditional handicraft in Serbia.

There are around 180 museums in Serbia, including the National Museum of Serbia, founded in 1844, houses one of the largest art collections in the Balkans, including many foreign pieces. Other art museums include the Museum of Contemporary Art in Belgrade, the Museum of Vojvodina and the Gallery of Matica Srpska in Novi Sad.

Literature

Serbian uses the Cyrillic alphabet created by the students of the brothers Cyril and Methodius at the Preslav Literary School in Bulgaria. Serbian works from the early 11th century are written in Glagolitic. Starting in the 12th century, books were written in Cyrillic. The Miroslav Gospels from 1186 are considered to be the oldest book of Serbian medieval history and are listed in UNESCO's Memory of the World Register.

Medieval authors include Saint Sava, Jefimija, Stefan Lazarević, Constantine of Kostenets and others. Under Ottoman occupation, when Serbia was not part of the European Renaissance, the tradition of oral story-telling through epic poetry was inspired by the Kosovo battle and folk tales rooted in Slavic mythology. Serbian epic poetry in those times was seen as the most effective way in preserving the national identity. The oldest known, entirely fictional poems, make up the Non-historic cycle, which is followed by poems inspired by events before, during and after the Battle of Kosovo. Some cycles are dedicated to Serbian legendary hero, Marko Kraljević, others are about hajduks and uskoks, and the last one is dedicated to the liberation of Serbia in the 19th century. Folk ballads include The Death of the Mother of the Jugović Family and The Mourning Song of the Noble Wife of the Asan Aga (1646), translated into European languages by Goethe, Walter Scott, Pushkin and Mérimée. A tale from Serbian folklore is The Nine Peahens and the Golden Apples.

Baroque trends in Serbian literature emerged in the late 17th ccentury. Baroque-influenced authors include Gavril Stefanović Venclović, Jovan Rajić, Zaharije Orfelin and Andrija Zmajević. Dositej Obradović was a prominent figure of the Age of Enlightenment, while Jovan Sterija Popović was a Classicist writer whose works also contained elements of Romanticism. In the era of national revival, in the first half of the 19th century, Vuk Stefanović Karadžić collected Serbian folk literature, and reformed the Serbian language and spelling, paving the way for Serbian Romanticism. The first half of the 19th century was dominated by Romanticist writers, including Petar II Petrović-Njegoš, Branko Radičević, Đura Jakšić, Jovan Jovanović Zmaj and Laza Kostić, while the second half of the century was marked by Realist writers such as Milovan Glišić, Laza Lazarević, Simo Matavulj, Stevan Sremac, Vojislav Ilić, Branislav Nušić, Radoje Domanović and Borisav Stanković.

The 20th century was dominated by the prose writers Meša Selimović (Death and the Dervish), Miloš Crnjanski (Migrations), Isidora Sekulić (The Chronicle of a Small Town Cemetery), Branko Ćopić (Eagles Fly Early), Borislav Pekić (The Time of Miracles), Danilo Kiš (The Encyclopedia of the Dead), Dobrica Ćosić (The Roots), Aleksandar Tišma (The Use of Man), Milorad Pavić and others. Notable poets include Milan Rakić, Jovan Dučić, Vladislav Petković Dis, Rastko Petrović, Stanislav Vinaver, Dušan Matić, Branko Miljković, Vasko Popa, Oskar Davičo, Miodrag Pavlović, and Stevan Raičković.

Pavić is a 21st century Serbian author whose Dictionary of the Khazars has been translated into 38 languages. Contemporary authors include David Albahari, Svetislav Basara, Goran Petrović, Gordana Kuić, Vuk Drašković and Vladislav Bajac. Serbian comics emerged in the 1930s and the medium remains popular today.

Ivo Andrić (The Bridge on the Drina) is a Serbian author  who won the Nobel Prize in Literature in 1961. Another writer was Desanka Maksimović, who for seven decades was the leading lady of Yugoslav poetry. She is honoured with statues, postage stamps, and the names of streets across Serbia.

There are 551 public libraries, the largest of which are: the National Library of Serbia in Belgrade with about 6 million items, and Matica Srpska (the oldest matica and Serbian cultural institution, founded in 1826) in Novi Sad with nearly 3.5 million volumes. In 2010, there were 10,989 books and brochures published. The book publishing market is dominated by several major publishers such as Laguna and Vulkan (both of which operate their own bookstore chains) and the industry's centrepiece event, annual Belgrade Book Fair, is the most visited cultural event in Serbia with 158,128 visitors in 2013. The highlight of the literary scene is awarding of NIN Prize, given every January since 1954 for the best newly published novel in Serbian.

Music

Composer and musicologist Stevan Stojanović Mokranjac is considered the founder of modern Serbian music. The Serbian composers of the first generation Petar Konjović, Stevan Hristić, and Miloje Milojević maintained the national expression and modernised the romanticism into the direction of impressionism. Other famous classical Serbian composers include Isidor Bajić, Stanislav Binički and Josif Marinković. There are three opera houses in Serbia: Opera of the National Theatre and Madlenianum Opera, both in Belgrade, and Opera of the Serbian National Theatre in Novi Sad. Four symphonic orchestra operate in the country: Belgrade Philharmonic Orchestra, Niš Symphony Orchestra, Novi Sad Philharmonic Orchestra and Symphonic Orchestra of Radio Television of Serbia. The Choir of Radio Television of Serbia is a leading vocal ensemble in the country. The BEMUS is one of the most prominent classical music festivals in the Southeastern Europe.

Traditional Serbian music includes various kinds of bagpipes, flutes, horns, trumpets, lutes, psalteries, drums and cymbals. The kolo is the traditional collective folk dance, which has a number of varieties throughout the regions. The most popular are those from Užice and Morava region. Sung epic poetry has been an integral part of Serbian and Balkan music for centuries. In the highlands of Serbia these long poems are typically accompanied on a one-string fiddle called the gusle, and concern themselves with themes from history and mythology. There are records of gusle being played at the court of the 13th-century King Stefan Nemanjić.

Pop music artist Željko Joksimović won second place at the 2004 Eurovision Song Contest and Marija Šerifović won the 2007 Eurovision Song Contest with the song "Molitva", and Serbia was the host of the 2008 edition of the contest. Pop singers include Zdravko Čolić, Vlado Georgiev, Aleksandra Radović, Jelena Tomašević and Nataša Bekvalac, among others.

Serbian rock was part of the former Yugoslav rock scene during the 1960s, 1970s and 1980s. During the 1990s and 2000s, the popularity of rock music declined in Serbia, and although several major mainstream acts managed to sustain their popularity, an underground and independent music scene developed. The 2000s saw a revival of the mainstream scene and the appearance of a large number of notable acts. Serbian rock acts include Atheist Rap, Bajaga i Instruktori, Đorđe Balašević, Bjesovi, Block Out, Crni Biseri, Darkwood Dub, Disciplina Kičme, Elipse, Ekatarina Velika, Električni Orgazam, Eva Braun, Galija, Generacija 5, Goblini, Idoli, Kanda, Kodža i Nebojša, Kerber, Korni Grupa, Laboratorija Zvuka, Slađana Milošević, Neverne Bebe, Obojeni Program, Orthodox Celts, Partibrejkers, Pekinška Patka, Piloti, Riblja Čorba, Ritam Nereda, Rambo Amadeus, S.A.R.S., Siluete, S Vremena Na Vreme, Šarlo Akrobata, Pop Mašina, Smak, U Škripcu, Van Gogh, YU Grupa, Zana and others.

Folk music in its original form has been a prominent music style since World War I following the early success of Sofka Nikolić. The music has been further promoted by Danica Obrenić, Anđelija Milić, Nada Mamula, and during the 60s and 70s with performers like Silvana Armenulić, Toma Zdravković, Lepa Lukić, Vasilija Radojčić, Vida Pavlović and Gordana Stojićević.

Turbo-folk music is a subgenre that was developed in Serbia in the late 1980s and the beginning of the 1990s and has since enjoyed an immense popularity through acts of Dragana Mirković, Zorica Brunclik, Šaban Šaulić, Ana Bekuta, Sinan Sakić, Vesna Zmijanac, Mile Kitić, Snežana Đurišić, Šemsa Suljaković, and Nada Topčagić. It is a blend of folk music with pop and dance elements and can be seen as a result of the urbanisation of folk music. In recent years, turbo-folk has featured even more pop music elements, and some of the performers have been labeled as pop-folk. The most famous among them are Ceca (often considered to be the biggest music star of Serbia), Jelena Karleuša, Aca Lukas, Seka Aleksić, Dara Bubamara, Indira Radić, Saša Matić, Viki Miljković, Stoja and Lepa Brena, arguably the most prominent performer of former Yugoslavia.

Balkan Brass, or truba ("trumpet") is a popular genre, especially in Central and Southern Serbia where Balkan Brass originated. The music has its tradition from the First Serbian Uprising. The trumpet was used as a military instrument to wake and gather soldiers and announce battles, and it took on the role of entertainment during downtime, as soldiers used it to transpose popular folk songs. When the war ended and the soldiers returned to the rural life, the music entered civilian life and eventually became a music style, accompanying births, baptisms, weddings, and funerals. There are two main varieties of this genre, one from Western Serbia and the other from Southern Serbia, with brass musician Boban Marković being one of the most respected names in the world of modern brass band bandleaders.

The most popular music festivals are Guča Trumpet Festival, with over 300,000 annual visitors, and EXIT in Novi Sad (won the Best Major Festival award at the European Festivals Awards for 2013 and 2017.), with 200,000 visitors in 2013. Other festivals include Nišville Jazz Festival in Niš and Gitarijada rock festival in Zaječar.

Theatre and cinema

Serbia has a well-established theatrical tradition with Joakim Vujić considered the founder of modern Serbian theatre. Serbia has 38 professional theatres and 11 theatres for children, the most important of which are National Theatre in Belgrade, Serbian National Theatre in Novi Sad, National Theatre in Subotica, National Theatre in Niš and Knjaževsko-srpski teatar in Kragujevac (the oldest theatre in Serbia, established in 1835). The Belgrade International Theatre Festival – BITEF, founded in 1967, is one of the oldest theatre festivals in the world, and it has become one of the five biggest European festivals. Sterijino pozorje is, on the other hand, a festival showcasing national drama plays. The most important Serbian playwrights were Jovan Sterija Popović and Branislav Nušić, while recent renowned names are Dušan Kovačević and Biljana Srbljanović.

The foundation of Serbian cinema dates back to 1896. The first Serbian feature film, titled The Life and Deeds of the Immortal Leader Karađorđe, was released in 1911. 

Serbia's film scene is one of the most dynamic smaller European cinemas. Serbia's film industry is heavily subsidized by the government, mainly through grants approved by the Film Centre of Serbia. As of 2019, there were 26 feature films produced in Serbia, of which 14 were domestic films. There are 23 operating cinemas in the country, of which 13 are multiplexes (all but two belonging to either Cineplexx or CineStar chains), with total attendance reaching 4.8 million. A comparatively high percentage of 20% of total tickets sold were for domestic films. Modern PFI Studios located in Šimanovci is nowadays Serbia's only major film studio complex; it consists of 9 sound stages and attracts mainly international productions, primarily American and West European. The Yugoslav Film Archive used to be former Yugoslavia's and now is Serbia's national film archive – with over 100 thousand film prints, it is among the five largest film archives in the world.

Famous Serbian filmmaker Emir Kusturica won two Palmes d'Or for Best Feature Film at the Cannes Film Festival, for When Father Was Away on Business in 1985 and then again for Underground in 1995; he has also won a Silver Bear at the Berlin Film Festival for Arizona Dream and a Silver Lion at the Venice Film Festival for Black Cat, White Cat. Other renowned directors include Dušan Makavejev, Želimir Žilnik (Golden Berlin Bear winner), Aleksandar Petrović, Živojin Pavlović, Goran Paskaljević, Goran Marković, Srđan Dragojević, Srdan Golubović and Mila Turajlić among others. Serbian-American screenwriter Steve Tesich won the Academy Award for Best Original Screenplay in 1979 for the movie Breaking Away.

Prominent movie stars in Serbia have left a celebrated heritage in the cinematography of Yugoslavia as well. Notable mentions are Zoran Radmilović, Pavle Vuisić, Ljubiša Samardžić, Olivera Marković, Mija Aleksić, Miodrag Petrović Čkalja, Ružica Sokić, Velimir Bata Živojinović, Danilo Bata Stojković, Seka Sablić, Olivera Katarina, Dragan Nikolić, Mira Stupica, Nikola Simić, Bora Todorović and others. Milena Dravić was one of the most celebrated actresses in Serbian cinematography, winning the Best Actress Award at the Cannes Film Festival in 1980.

Serbian actress Jasna Đuričić was named the best actress in Europe for 2021 at the 34th European Film Awards (EFA) for the Bosnian movie "Quo vadis, Aida".

Media

Freedom of the press and freedom of speech are guaranteed by the constitution of Serbia. Serbia is ranked 90th out of 180 countries in the 2019 Press Freedom Index report compiled by Reporters Without Borders. The report noted that media outlets and journalists continue to face partisan and government pressure over editorial policies. Also, the media are now more heavily dependent on advertising contracts and government subsidies to survive financially.

According to EBU research in 2018, Serbs on average watch five and a half hours of television per day, making it the second highest average in Europe. There are seven nationwide free-to-air television channels, with public broadcaster Radio Television of Serbia (RTS) operating three (RTS1, RTS2 and RTS3) and private broadcasters operating four (Pink, Prva, Happy, and O2). In 2019, preferred usage of these channels was as follows: 19.3% for RTS1, 17.6% for Pink, 10.5% for Prva, 6.9% for Happy, 4.1% for O2, and 1.6% for RTS2. There are 28 regional television channels and 74 local television channels. Besides terrestrial channels there are dozens of Serbian television channels available only on cable or satellite. These include regional news N1, commercial channel Nova S, and regional sports channels Sport Klub and Arena Sport, among others.

There are 247 radio stations in Serbia. Out of these, six are radio stations with national coverage, including two of public broadcaster Radio Television of Serbia (Radio Belgrade 1 and Radio Belgrade 2/Radio Belgrade 3) and four private ones (Radio S1, Radio S2, Play Radio, and Radio Hit FM). Also, there are 34 regional stations and 207 local stations.

There are 305 newspapers published in Serbia of which 12 are daily newspapers. Dailies Politika and Danas are Serbia's papers of record, the former being the oldest newspaper in the Balkans, founded in 1904. Highest circulation newspapers are tabloids Večernje Novosti, Blic, Kurir, and Informer, all with more than 100,000 copies sold. There is one daily newspaper devoted to sports (Sportski žurnal), one business daily (Privredni pregled), two regional newspapers (Dnevnik published in Novi Sad and Narodne novine from Niš), and one minority-language daily (Magyar Szo in Hungarian, published in Subotica).

There are 1,351 magazines published in the country. These include: weekly news magazines NIN, Vreme and Nedeljnik; popular science magazine Politikin Zabavnik; women's magazine Lepota & Zdravlje; auto magazine SAT revija; and IT magazine Svet kompjutera. In addition, there is a wide selection of Serbian editions of international magazines, such as Cosmopolitan, Elle, Men's Health, National Geographic, Le Monde diplomatique, Playboy, and Hello!, among others.

The main news agencies are Tanjug, Beta and Fonet.

, out of 432 web-portals (mainly on the .rs domain) the most visited are online editions of printed dailies Blic and Kurir, news web-portal B92 and classifieds KupujemProdajem.

Cuisine

Serbian cuisine is largely heterogeneous in a way characteristic of the Balkans and, especially, the former Yugoslavia. It features foods characteristic of lands formerly under Turkish suzerainty as well as cuisine originating from other parts of Central Europe (especially Austria and Hungary). Food is very important in Serbian social life, particularly during religious holidays such as Christmas, Easter and feast days i.e. slava.

Staples of the Serbian diet include bread, meat, fruits, vegetables, and dairy products. Bread plays an important role in Serbian cuisine and can be found in religious rituals. A traditional Serbian welcome is to offer bread and salt to guests. Meat is widely consumed, as is fish. The southern Serbian city of Leskovac is host to Roštiljijada, a yearly grilled meat barbecue-based festival that is considered the biggest barbecue festival in the Balkans. 

Other Serbian specialties include ćevapčići (grilled and seasoned caseless sausages made from minced meat), pljeskavica (grilled spiced meat patty made from a mixture of pork, beef and lamb), gibanica (cheese pie), burek (baked pastry made from a thin flaky dough that is stuffed with meat, cheese or vegetables), sarma (stuffed cabbage), punjena paprika (stuffed pepper), moussaka (casserole made from minced meat, eggs, and potatoes), Karađorđeva šnicla (veal or pork schnitzel that is stuffed with kajmak), đuveč (meat and vegetable stew), pasulj (bean soup), podvarak (roast meat with sauerkraut), ajvar (roasted red pepper spread), kajmak (dairy product similar to clotted cream), čvarci (variant of pork rinds), proja (cornbread) and kačamak (corn-flour porridge).

Serbians claim their country as the birthplace of rakia (rakija), a highly alcoholic drink primarily distilled from fruit. Rakia in various forms is found throughout the Balkans, notably in Bulgaria, Croatia, Slovenia, Montenegro, Hungary and Turkey. Slivovitz (šljivovica), a plum brandy, is a type of rakia which is considered the national drink of Serbia. In 2021, Serbia's sljivovica was added to the United Nations Intangible Cultural Heritage List as a "cherished tradition to be preserved by humanity".

Winemaking traditions in Serbia dates back to Roman times. Serbian wines are produced in 22 different geographical regions, with white wine dominating the total amount. Besides rakia and wine, beer is a very popular alcoholic beverage in the country. Pale lagers are currently and have been the traditional beer choice for Serbians. Meanwhile, dark lagers, while still being popular, are produced and consumed in much smaller quantities. The most popular domestic brands of beer are Jelen, followed by Lav, which are both pale lagers.

As in the rest of the former Yugoslavia, coffee drinking is an important cultural and social practice and Serbian coffee (a local variant of Turkish coffee) is the most commonly consumed non-alcoholic beverage in Serbia.

Sports

Sports play an important role in Serbian society, and the country has a strong sporting history. The most popular sports in Serbia are football, basketball, tennis, volleyball, water polo and handball.

Professional sports in Serbia are organised by sporting federations and leagues (in the case of team sports). One of the particularities of Serbian professional sports is the existence of many multi-sport clubs (called "sports societies"), the biggest and most successful of which are Red Star, Partizan, and Beograd in Belgrade; Vojvodina in Novi Sad; Radnički in Kragujevac; and Spartak in Subotica.

Football is the most popular sport in Serbia, and the Football Association of Serbia with 146,845 registered players, is the largest sporting association in the country. Dragan Džajić was officially recognised as "the best Serbian player of all time" by the Football Association of Serbia, and more recently the likes of Nemanja Vidić, Dejan Stanković, Branislav Ivanović, Aleksandar Kolarov and Nemanja Matić play for the elite European clubs, developing the nation's reputation as one of the world's biggest exporters of footballers. The Serbia national football team lacks relative success although it qualified for three of the last four FIFA World Cups. The two main football clubs in Serbia are Red Star (winner of the 1991 European Cup) and Partizan (a finalist at the 1966 European Cup), both from Belgrade. The rivalry between the two clubs is known as the "Eternal Derby", and is often cited as one of the most exciting sports rivalries in the world.

Serbia is one of the traditional powerhouses of world basketball, as Serbia men's national basketball team have won two World Championships (in 1998 and 2002), three European Championships (1995, 1997, and 2001) and two Olympic silver medals (in 1996 and 2016) as well. The women's national basketball team have won two European Championships (2015, 2021) and an Olympic bronze medal in 2016. A total of 31 Serbian players have played in the NBA in the last three decades, including Nikola Jokić (2020–21, 2021–22 NBA MVP and five-time NBA All-Star), Predrag "Peja" Stojaković (2011 NBA champion and three-time NBA All-Star), and Vlade Divac (2001 NBA All-Star and Basketball Hall of Famer). The renowned "Serbian coaching school" produced many of the most successful European basketball coaches of all time, such as Željko Obradović (who won a record 9 Euroleague titles as a coach), Dušan Ivković, Svetislav Pešić, and Igor Kokoškov (the first coach born and raised outside of North America to be hired as a head coach in the NBA). KK Partizan basketball club was the 1992 European champion. 

The Serbia men's national water polo team is one of the most successful national teams, having won an Olympic gold medal in 2016 and 2020, three World Championships (2005, 2009 and 2015), and seven European Championships (2001, 2003, 2006, 2012, 2014, 2016 and 2018). VK Partizan has won a joint-record seven European champion titles.

The recent success of Serbian tennis players has led to an immense growth in the popularity of tennis in the country. Novak Djokovic has won a joint-record 22 Grand Slam singles titles and has held the No. 1 spot in the ATP rankings for a record duration. He became the eighth player in history to achieve the Career Grand Slam, the third man to hold all four major titles at once, the first ever to do so on three different surfaces, and the first in the Open Era to achieve a double Career Grand Slam. Ana Ivanovic (champion of 2008 French Open) and Jelena Janković were both ranked No. 1 in the WTA rankings. There were two No. 1 ranked-tennis double players as well: Nenad Zimonjić (three-time men's double and four-time mixed double Grand Slam champion) and Slobodan Živojinović. The Serbia men's tennis national team won the 2010 Davis Cup and 2020 ATP Cup, while Serbia women's tennis national team reached the final at 2012 Fed Cup.

Serbia is one of the leading volleyball countries in the world. Its men's national team won the gold medal at the 2000 Olympics, the European Championship three times, as well as the 2016 FIVB World League. The women's national volleyball team are current world Champions, have won European Championship three times (2011, 2017 and 2019), as well as an Olympic silver medal in 2016. 

Jasna Šekarić, sport shooter, is one of the athletes with the most appearances at the Olympic Games. She has won a total of five Olympic medals and three World Championship gold medals. Other noted Serbian athletes include: swimmers Milorad Čavić (2009 World championships gold and silver medalist as well as 2008 Olympic silver medalist on 100-metre butterfly in historic race with American swimmer Michael Phelps) and Nađa Higl (2009 World champion in 200-metre breaststroke); track and field athletes Vera Nikolić (former world record holder in 800 metres) and Ivana Španović (long-jumper; four-time European champion, World indoor champion and bronze medalist at the 2016 Olympics); wrestler Davor Štefanek (2016 Olympic gold medalist and 2014 World champion), and taekwondoist Milica Mandić (2012 Olympic gold medalist and 2017 world champion).

Serbia has hosted several major sport competitions, including the 2005 Men's European Basketball Championship, 2005 Men's European Volleyball Championship, 2006 and 2016 Men's European Water Polo Championships, 2009 Summer Universiade, 2012 European Men's Handball Championship, and 2013 World Women's Handball Championship. The most important annual sporting events held in the country are the Belgrade Marathon and the Tour de Serbie cycling race.

See also
Index of Serbia-related articles
Outline of Serbia

Notes

References

Citations

Sources

External links

National tourist organisation of Serbia
Serbia from UCB Libraries GovPubs.

Serbia profile from the BBC News.

Key Development Forecasts for Serbia from International Futures.
Serbia. The World Factbook. Central Intelligence Agency.
Serbia Corruption Profile from the Business Anti-Corruption Portal

 
Countries in Europe
Republics
Balkan countries
Central European countries
Southeastern European countries
Southern European countries
Landlocked countries
Member states of the Council of Europe
Member states of the United Nations
Serbian-speaking countries and territories
States and territories established in 1882
Christian states